Valley Wells is a census-designated place in Inyo County, California. Prior to 2010, for census purposes it was part of Homewood Canyon-Valley Wells CDP. The 2010 census reported that population was zero. The town is now registered as California Historical Landmark #443; in 1849, several groups of midwestern emigrants settled here to secure water from nearby Searles Lake.

The California Historical Landmark reads:
NO. 443 VALLEY WELLS - In this area, several groups of midwestern emigrants who had escaped from hazards and privations in Death Valley in 1849 sought to secure water from Searles Lake. They turned northward and westward in despair when they discovered its salty nature, and with great difficulty crossed the Argus and other mountains to reach settlements of Central and Southern California.

Recreation

Historically, the Valley Wells area was used as for aquatic recreation for the residents of Trona, CA

Although, no residents live in Valley Wells, it is the home of the Trona Golf course on Valley Wells Road

Valley Wells is also the home of the Valley Wells Recreation Area, which is maintained by Searles Lake Gem and Mineral Society, but owned by Searles Valley Minerals, Inc

See also
California Historical Landmarks in Inyo County
History of California through 1899

References

Census-designated places in Inyo County, California
Ghost towns in Inyo County, California
Census-designated places in California
1849 establishments in California
California Historical Landmarks